Shane Tichowitsch (born 9 January 1967) is a former professional Australian darts player.

Career

He qualified for the 2011 PDC World Darts Championship. He is a semi-professional darts player and has been as high as 93 in the world. He qualified for the 2011 PDC World Darts Championship, however he was defeated 1–3 by Andy Smith in the last 64 of the competition.

In 2012, Tichowitsch won four successive events on the DartPlayers Australia tour, later finishing top of the Order of Merit and therefore returned to the World Championship in its 2013 edition. He lost to Dave Chisnall 0–3 in the first round, but his performance did not reflect the scoreline, with Chisnall admitting Tichowitsch deserved more out of the game. Tichowitsch averaged 92.07 and took out finishes of 161 and 144 against the world number 12.

In 2014 he won four events on the Australian Darts Tour and also qualified for the Perth Darts Masters (losing 6–2 to Paul Nicholson in the first round) and the Sydney Darts Masters (losing 6–1 to James Wade in the first round). Tichowitsch could only reach one final in 2015 which came at the Dosh Balcatta, but he lost 6–2 to Beau Anderson.

World Championship performances

PDC

2011: First round (lost to Andy Smith 1–3) (sets) 
2013: First round (lost to Dave Chisnall 0–3)

References

External links

1967 births
Living people
Australian darts players
Professional Darts Corporation associate players
Sportspeople from Bundaberg